The Battle of Montecristi was fought on 15 May 1864 in the Dominican Republic, during the War of Restoration (1863–65) between Dominican separatists and Spain. A Spanish force of 6,000 troops supported by 13 cannons, commanded by General José La Gándara, appointed captain-general of Santo Domingo since March, confronted the Dominican separatists commanded by Benito Monción. The latter, who took refuge in the town of Monte Cristi, suffered a defeat and were forced to retreat, but not without inflicting disproportionate casualties on their opponents. The future Spanish general Fernando Primo de Rivera y Sobremonte was wounded during the fighting. 

This battle is the most significant victory won by Spain in this conflict during the year 1864. The Dominicans subsequently evaded direct confrontations and opted for a relentless guerrilla tactic which forced the Spaniards to confine themselves to Santo Domingo, the capital.

Realizing that the reconquest of the island promised to be costly and uncertain, Spain gave up its enterprise and Queen Isabella II of Spain authorized the abandonment of the colony on 3 May 1865.

References

Monte Cristi
Monte Cristi
Monte Cristi